"Behind Those Eyes" is a song by American rock band 3 Doors Down. It was released on April 4, 2005, as the second single from their third studio album, Seventeen Days (2005). The song peaked at number 12 on the US Billboard Mainstream Rock chart and at number 25 on the Billboard Modern Rock Tracks chart. The song was one of the themes for WWE's WrestleMania 21.

Track listing
US promo CD
 "Behind Those Eyes" (radio edit) – 4:05
 "Behind Those Eyes" (album version) – 4:19

Charts

References

3 Doors Down songs
2004 songs
2005 singles
Republic Records singles
Song recordings produced by Johnny K
Songs written by Brad Arnold
Songs written by Chris Henderson (American musician)
Songs written by Matt Roberts (musician)
Songs written by Todd Harrell